David Limberský (born 6 October 1983) is a former Czech professional footballer who played for Czech clubs FC Viktoria Plzeň and AC Sparta Prague. He was a member of the Czech Republic national football team.

Club career
Born in Plzeň, Limberský played for hometown team Viktoria Plzeň and spent time at Italian side Modena on loan in the 2003–04 season. He joined Tottenham Hotspur in December 2004 on a six-month loan. Upon signing for Tottenham, Limberský was compared to Czech legend Pavel Nedvěd by Spurs coach Martin Jol. Despite this, Limberský did not feature in any of Tottenham's matches during his time in England.

Limberský played in the final of the 2009–10 Czech Cup in a 2–1 victory against Jablonec.

He played in the first Czech Supercup against Sparta Prague in 2010. He started at left-back and played the entire game in which Sparta triumphed 1–0.

In the third qualifying round of the 2010–11 UEFA Europa League, Limberský scored a memorable goal from outside the box in the first leg against Besiktas in the 28th minute. Plzen went on to lose 4–1 on aggregate after a 1–1 draw in the first leg.

Limberský played in all of Plzeň's matches in the 2011–12 UEFA Champions League. In the group stages of the following season's Europa League, he was headbutted by Diego Costa, an incident which brought the Atlético Madrid forward a four-match UEFA ban.

International career
Limberský played for the Czech Republic at the 2003 FIFA World Youth Championship. He scored both of the Czech Republic's goals against Australia and Brazil respectively.

On 5 June 2009, at the age of 25, Limberský made his debut for the Czech Republic national football team with a 1–0 victory against Malta in a friendly.

He was chosen as part of the Czech Republic's squad for the 2011 Kirin Cup. However, Limberský did not feature in any of their games in the tournament.

Euro 2012
Limberský was called up for UEFA Euro 2012, despite not playing in any of the qualifiers for the tournament and having never previously played a competitive game for his national side. He was left out of the Czechs' first game against Russia, where his side were heavily beaten 4–1. Limberský was brought in for the Czech Republic's second game against Greece in his first ever competitive game for the national side, playing at left back. The Czech Republic won that game 2–1, with Limberský doing enough to be retained for the Czech Republic's must-win game against co-hosts Poland. His side defeated Poland 1–0 and ended up as group winners, meaning that they would face Portugal in the quarter finals. Limberský again played left back against Portugal where the Czech Republic were knocked out after a 1–0 loss.

Euro 2016

Controversy
Limberský gained media attention after crashing his Bentley car in September 2015 and subsequently behaving abusively towards several police officers and testing with a high blood alcohol content, offences which carry a maximum three-year prison sentence. He was subsequently stripped of the captaincy of Viktoria Plzeň and fined for "an absolutely unacceptable violation of the professional contract". Limberský apologised, but four days after the incident, celebrated his first of two goals in a 4–0 win against Příbram by pretending to drive a car. The club moved to distance itself from Limberský's gestures.

Career statistics

Club

International goals
Scores and results list Czech Republic's goal tally first.

Honours

Club
Viktoria Plzeň
 Czech First League: 2010–11, 2012–13, 2014–15
 Czech 2. Liga: 2002–03
 Czech Cup: 2009-10
 Czech Supercup: 2011

References

External links
 
 

1983 births
Living people
Sportspeople from Plzeň
Association football fullbacks
Czech footballers
Czech Republic youth international footballers
Czech Republic under-21 international footballers
Czech Republic international footballers
Czech expatriate footballers
Expatriate footballers in Italy
Expatriate footballers in England
FC Viktoria Plzeň players
Tottenham Hotspur F.C. players
Modena F.C. players
AC Sparta Prague players
Serie A players
Czech First League players
UEFA Euro 2012 players
UEFA Euro 2016 players